North Salem is a town in the northeastern section  of Westchester County, New York, United States. It is a suburb of New York City, located approximately 50 miles north of Midtown Manhattan. The population of North Salem was 5,104 at the 2010 census.

According to the  demographics data available from the Census Bureau released in July 2016, North Salem had a population of 5,182.

The town is part of New York's Eighteenth Congressional District, represented by Mike Lawler, a Republican. The current town supervisor is Warren Lucas, a Republican, who was first elected in 2009.

History
Prior to the end of the Colonial Era, North Salem and the neighboring town of South Salem were a single municipality, Salem, with the towns splitting sometime around the end of May, 1784. For about four years after the split, North Salem was known as Upper Salem, until an act of the New York State Legislature in 1788 gave the town its modern name.

During the American Revolutionary War, John Paulding and Isaac Van Wart left from what was later known as the Yerkes Tavern on Sept. 22, 1780, joined by David Williams. Their expedition resulted in the capture of the British spy Major John André. The foundation of Yerkes (Yerks) Tavern is all that is left of the historic building, once at the intersection of Yerkes Road and Bogtown Road. An historic plaque posted on the site reads:On this site stood one of North Salem's early taverns. Its proprietor was John Yerkes, who received a license from the town "to operate a tavern or inn for the accommodation and entertainment of travelers" in 1815.
Early records indicate that this property was owned by the Smith family prior to this date.The 1800 United States Census recorded several hundred enslaved individuals being held in North Salem. New York began operating under a policy of gradual abolition in 1799, with the last enslaved individuals being freed in 1827; therefore the practice of slavery in North Salem came to an end sometime between the years 1800 and 1827.

The Union Hall was added to the National Register of Historic Places in 1986.

Geography
The north town line is the border of Putnam County, New York; and the east town line is the border of Connecticut.

A geographic curiosity of North Salem is the so-called Standing Rock, a granite boulder sitting on several smaller stones. Since the boulder is not consistent with the geographic surroundings, it has been hypothesized that the rock was deposited by glaciers during the Last Ice Age, although others argue that it may have been moved and placed by Vikings or Native Americans.

Demographics

In 2011, the average income for a household in the town was $157,258, with an average net worth of $1,300,058. The median house value in 2009 was $772,817. The per capita income for the town was $59,403. About 1.5% of families and 2.0% of the population were below the poverty line, including 2.2% of those under age 18 and none of those age 65 or over. As of the census of 2000, there were 5,173 people, 1,764 households, and 1,374 families residing in the town. The population density was 241.5 people per square mile (93.2/km2). There were 1,979 housing units at an average density of 92.4 per square mile (35.7/km2). The racial makeup of the town was 95.44% White, 0.75% African American, 0.08% Native American, 0.97% Asian, 1.12% from other races, and 1.64% from two or more races. Hispanic or Latino of any race were 3.65% of the population.

There were 1,764 households, out of which 39.2% had children under the age of 18 living with them, 68.1% were married couples living together, 7.5% had a female householder with no husband present, and 22.1% were non-families. 17.5% of all households were made up of individuals, and 5.3% had someone living alone who was 65 years of age or older. The average household size was 2.80 and the average family size was 3.17. In the town, the population was spread out, with 26.2% under the age of 18, 4.4% from 18 to 24, 28.5% from 25 to 44, 27.0% from 45 to 64, and 13.9% who were 65 years of age or older. The median age was 40 years. For every 100 females, there were 91.6 males. For every 100 females age 18 and over, there were 87.4 males.

Hamlets 
Croton Falls, New York – a hamlet in the northwest corner of the town with its own Metro-North station
Grants Corner – a hamlet southeast of North Salem
North Salem – a hamlet in the western part of the town.  The North Salem Town Hall was added to the National Register of Historic Places in 1980.
Salem Center – a hamlet at the eastern end of Titicus Reservoir. The fictitious headquarters of the X-Men Marvel Comics superhero team is located in Salem Center.
 Purdys – a hamlet south of Croton Falls with its own Purdy's station.  The Joseph Purdy Homestead was added to the National Register of Historic Places in 1973.
Peach Lake- a hamlet and CDP in the northeastern part of town, situated mostly in the town of Southeast, Putnam County.

Education

North Salem Middle School/High School is at 230 June Road in North Salem. The North Salem School District's border encompasses the entire town of North Salem, in addition to parts of the Putnam County towns of Southeast, and Carmel. Some residents of nearby Somers also reside within the district line.

In 2004, the high school was distinguished as a Blue Ribbon School for high levels of educational achievement by the United States Department of Education. The middle school, which shares the same building as the high school, serves grades 6–8. This school is particularly small, with about 90 children on average per grade, making the student to faculty ratio relatively small.

Town government 
North Salem's town government consists of a town supervisor and four town board members. The supervisor serves a two-year term, and the board members serve four-year terms. Elections are staggered such that in any given election year, the supervisor and two board members' seats will be up for election.

*Aronchick first won his seat in 2011, lost it in 2015 to Lisa Douglas, and won a seat back in 2016 in a special election.

Notable people
 Fanny Crosby (1820-1915), writer
 Chapman Grant (1887-1983), grandson of President Ulysses S. Grant
 Paul Newman (1925-2008), actor, director and race car driver
 Dick Button (born 1929) figure skater
 David Letterman (born 1947), talk show host
 David Marks (born 1948), original member of the Beach Boys
 Alan Menken (born 1949), film composer and songwriter
 Richard Gere (born 1949), actor
 Steven Rattner, (born 1952), financier, in charge of 2008 General Motors auto bailout, owns a horse farm in North Salem.
 Laurence D. Fink (born 1952), business executive, owns a farm there
 Emily Bindiger (born 1955), singer
 Robbie Kondor, musician
 Rodrigo Pessoa (born 1972), Brazilian show jumper
 Jacob M. Appel (born 1973), author of Einstein's Beach House
 Yannis Pappas (born 1976), comedian
 Sam Savitt (born 1917-2000), equestrian artist and author

See also
South Salem, New York
Baxter Preserve, North Salem's most popular park
Hammond Museum and Japanese Stroll Garden

References

External links

Town of North Salem official website
Ruth Keeler Memorial Library
North Salem Central School District
North Salem Lions
North Salem Chamber of Commerce
 Balanced Rock of the Hudson Valley - Large perched rock and possible Druid Dolmen located in North Salem, NY

Towns in Westchester County, New York
Towns in the New York metropolitan area